John Alfred Wilson (July 25, 1833 – March 28, 1904) was a member of the Andrew's Raid and one of the first recipients of the Medal of Honor.

Biography 
Wilson was born in Columbus, Ohio on July 25, 1833. He served in the 21st Ohio Infantry as a private. He participated in the Great Locomotive Chase in April 1862. Following the war he wrote a book entitled "Adventures of Alf Wilson – A Thrilling Episode of the Dark Days of the Rebellion". He died on March 28, 1904 and is buried in Union Hill Cemetery, Bowling Green, Ohio.

Career 
For extraordinary heroism in April 1862, in action during the Andrew's Raid in Georgia. Private Wilson was one of the 19 of 22 men (including two civilians) who, by direction of General Mitchell (or Buell), penetrated nearly 200 miles/200 miles (320 km) south into enemy territory and captured a railroad train at Big Shanty, Georgia, and attempted to destroy the bridges and track between Chattanooga and Atlanta.

References 

1833 births
1904 deaths
United States Army Medal of Honor recipients
American Civil War recipients of the Medal of Honor
Union Army soldiers